Mohnish Pabrai is an Indian-American businessman, investor, and philanthropist. He was born in Bombay (Mumbai), India, on June 12, 1964.

Career 
Pabrai worked with Tellabs between 1986–91, first in its high speed data networking group, and then in 1989, joined its international subsidiary, working in international marketing and sales.

In 1991 he started his IT consulting and systems integration company, TransTech, Inc. with about US$30,000 from his own 401(k) account and US$70,000 from credit card debt. He sold the company in 2000 to Kurt Salmon Associates for US$20 million. Today he is the managing partner of the Pabrai Investment Funds (a family of hedge funds inspired by Buffett Partnerships), which he founded in 1999.

Books 
Pabrai has high regard for Warren Buffett and admits that his investment style is copied from Buffett and others. He has written a book on his investing style: The Dhandho Investor: The Low - Risk Value Method to High Returns. In June 2007 he made headlines by bidding US$650,100 with Guy Spier for a charity lunch with Buffett.

Another book by Pabrai is Mosaic: Perspectives on Investing. In this book Pabrai has distilled the Warren Buffett method of investing down to a few points. These points are made in a series of articles he authored for various newsletters and web sites between 2001 and 2003 (the book reprints these articles in reverse chronological order).

Pabrai's approach to life is covered extensively in Guy Spier's book, The Education of a Value Investor, in particular in a chapter titled "Doing Business the Buffett-Pabrai Way".

Dakshana Foundation 
In 2005, Pabrai and his wife, Harina Kapoor started the Dakshana Foundation (Infinite good) with the goal of recycling most of their wealth back to society. Their starting point is to give back approximately 2%, or US$1 million every year. The initial goal is the alleviation of poverty in India. The tool that has been chosen is to provide tutoring services to some of the least privileged members of Indian society, and to enable them to attend some of the elite institutions of higher learning. Pabrai credits Anand Kumar, the founder of Ramanujan School of Mathematics (also known as the Super 30) with originating this idea.

References

External links 
 PabraiFunds.com Pabrai Investment Funds - Official Site
 Wiley.com The Dhandho Investor: The Low - Risk Value Method to High Returns
 Interview With Mohnish Pabrai
 Article by Guy Spier, "My $650,000 lunch with Warren Buffett

Living people
American chief executives
American financiers
American investors
American hedge fund managers
American money managers
American people of Indian descent
American philanthropists
American stock traders
Businesspeople from California
Businesspeople in information technology
People from Irvine, California
Stock and commodity market managers
1964 births
Indian investors